Sammy Kipketer (born 29 September 1981 in Rokocho, Keiyo District) is a Kenyan long-distance runner who specialises in the 5000 metres and cross-country running.

Career
He graduated from Lelboinet Secondary School in 1998. The next year he qualified for the 1999 IAAF World Cross Country Championships, where he finished sixth at the junior race. The Kenyan Army recruited him in 2001.

He now trains with Daniel Komen who was Kenya's foremost runner for a while. Kipketer broke the 3,000m junior world record twice when he was 17. He has also broken the 13-minute barrier for the 5000 metres. He won a 10000 metres in Brussels with his personal record time of 26:49.38. Right now he is focusing on 10-kilometre races.

He holds the 5 kilometres road running world record as recognised by the Association of Road Racing Statisticians (ARRS), while IAAF does not keep a world record over the distance. Kipketer's time, 12:59.5 minutes, was set at the Carlsbad 5000 race in Carlsbad, California in March 2000.

He won the Parelloop 10K in race in the Netherlands in 2001, setting a new world record of 27.18 minutes. Haile Gebrselassie ran the distance in 27:02 minutes in 2002 in Doha, IAAF recognised the time as world record, while ARRS rejected it claiming Gebrselassie got assistance by a vehicle. Thus Kipketer's time is still a valid ARRS world record (as of 2007), although Micah Kogo has since set a better time, still awaiting ratification by ARRS.

Kipketer is managed by Tom Ratcliffe of Kimbia Athletics and coached by Dieter Hogen. He belongs to the Keiyo tribe, a sub-tribe of Kalenjin. He was born in Rokocho, near Kaptarakwa. He is married and has 1 daughter, and he currently lives in Merewet, Uasin Gishu District. He is 1.66 metres tall and has a weight of 52 kg.

International competitions

Personal bests
3000 metres - 7:33.62 min (2001)
5000 metres - 12:52.33 min (2003)
10,000 metres - 26:49.38 min (2002)

References

External links 

IAAF, March 14, 2005: Focus on Africa - Sammy Kipketer (KEN)
PACE Sports Management

1981 births
Living people
Kenyan male long-distance runners
Commonwealth Games gold medallists for Kenya
Commonwealth Games medallists in athletics
Athletes (track and field) at the 2002 Commonwealth Games
World Athletics Championships athletes for Kenya
Kenyan male cross country runners
Medallists at the 2002 Commonwealth Games